The 2016 Swindon Borough Council election took place on 5 May 2016 to elect members of Swindon Borough Council in England. This was on the same day as other local elections.

The Conservatives held on to their majority on the council but it was lowered to three after losing councillors to Labour in Lydiard & Freshbrook and Liden, Eldene & Park South.

Results by ward 
An asterisk * indicates an incumbent seeking re-election

Blunsdon & Highworth

Central

Covingham & Dorcan

Eastcott

Gorse Hill & Pinehurst

Haydon Wick

Liden, Eldene & Park South

Lydiard & Freshbrook

Mannington and Western

Old Town

Penhill & Upper Stratton

Priory Vale

Ridgeway

Rodbourne Cheney

Shaw

St Andrews

St Margaret & South Marston

Walcot & Park North

Wroughton & Wichelstowe

References

2016 English local elections
2016
2010s in Wiltshire